The Sterling-Winthrop Research Centre was a research centre in Alnwick.

History
It was also known as the Alnwick Research Center. It was part of the Sterling Research Group, owned by Sterling Drug. It was taken over by Sanofi-Aventis, run by Sanofi R&D.

Closure
The site was near a Homebase and Argos. The site was put up for sale by Sanofi-Aventis in 2009.

Structure
It was sited off the A1068 near the junction with the A1, in the south of Alnwick.

References

External links
 Sanofi in the UK

Alnwick
Pharmaceutical industry in the United Kingdom
Pharmaceutical research institutes
Sanofi
Science and technology in Northumberland